The Piermaster's House is a 19th-century Grade II listed building located within the Albert Dock in Liverpool, England. Built in 1852 to house the piermaster and his family the building now serves as part of the Museum of Liverpool showcasing a 1940s wartime interior. In 2019 it welcomed 89,140 visitors.

References

Bibliography

External links

Grade II listed buildings in Liverpool
Grade II listed houses
Historic house museums in Merseyside
Houses completed in 1852
Museums in Liverpool
Tourist attractions in Liverpool